The 1984–85 WKU Lady Toppers basketball team represents Western Kentucky University during the 1984–85 NCAA Division I women's basketball season. The Lady Toppers were led by head coach Paul Sanderford and WKU all-time leading scorer Lillie Mason. The team finished second in the Sun Belt Conference and received a bid to the 1985 NCAA Division I women's basketball tournament where they advanced to the Final Four.  Mason, Clemette Haskins, and Kami Thomas were named to the All-Conference team and the SBC Tournament team.  Mason was selected to the NCAA Final Four team as well as the being selected the NCAA Mideast Region Most Outstanding Player; Haskins joined her on the All-Region team.

Schedule

|-
!colspan=6| Regular Season

|-

|-
!colspan=6| 1985 Sun Belt Conference women's basketball tournament

|-
!colspan=6| 1985 NCAA Division I women's basketball tournament

References

Western Kentucky
Western Kentucky Lady Toppers basketball seasons
NCAA Division I women's basketball tournament Final Four seasons
WKU Lady Toppers basketball team
WKU Lady Toppers basketball team